Lumwana Radiants is a football team from lumwana, kalumbila, Zambia, currently playing in the Zambian Premier League. They were the first team from northwestern Zambia to play in the Zambian top flight.

History
Radiants won promotion to the Zambian Premier League in 2015 after winning the Division One North competition with a game to spare. The club upgraded their Lumwana Grounds before the 2016 season in order to participate.

Lumwana extended their top flight stay in the 2018 season after surviving relegation on the last round defeating Nchanga Rangers F.C. 2–0 to finish 16th, one spot out of the relegation spots.

References

Football clubs in Zambia
Association football clubs established in 2010